John Burnes may refer to:
 John Francis Burnes, officer in the United States Marine Corps
USS John Francis Burnes (DD-299)
 John David Burnes, Canadian archer

See also
 John Burns (disambiguation)